is a railway station on the Keihan Nakanoshima Line in Kita-ku, Osaka, Japan. It opened on October 19, 2008 (the day of the opening of the Nakanoshima Line). The station is the terminal of the Nakanoshima Line.

A separate Nakanoshima Station, to be operated jointly by West Japan Railway Company (JR West) and Nankai Railway, is to be constructed as part of the Naniwasuji Line project, with opening anticipated around spring 2031.

The station name occasionally accompanies the secondary name .

Station layout

The station consists of an underground island platform serving three tracks.

Surroundings
Nakanoshima Yonchōme, Kita-ku
The National Museum of Art, Osaka
Osaka Science Museum
Nakanoshima Gochōme, Kita-ku
Rihga Royal Hotel
Osaka International Convention Center
Sumitomo Hospital
Nakanoshima Rokuchōme, Kita-ku
Nakanoshima Center Building
Nakanoshima Plaza
Nakanoshima Intes
Fukushima Itchōme, Fukushima-ku
Hotarumachi (Asahi Broadcasting Corporation, ABC Hall, Dojima River Forum, etc.)
Nakanoshima Public Prosecutors Office Building (Osaka High Public Prosecutors Office, Osaka District Public Prosecutors Office, etc.)
Fukushima Nichōme, Fukushima-ku
KEPCO Hospital
Fukushima Yonchōme, Fukushima-ku
Osaka Koseinenkin Hospital
Shimo-fukushima Park
Fukushima Gohōme, Fukushima-ku
Laxa Osaka
Hotel Hanshin, etc.
Noda Itchōme, Fukushima-ku
Osaka Central Wholesale Market
Tosabori, Nishi-ku
Tosabori Daibiru
JSOL Osaka Head Office
The Japan Research Institute, Limited. Osaka Head Office

Train stations
Hanshin Railway Main Line Fukushima Station
JR West JR Tōzai Line Shin-Fukushima Station
JR West Osaka Loop Line Fukushima Station

Adjacent stations

Fukushima-ku, Osaka
Nakanoshima
Railway stations in Japan opened in 2008
Railway stations in Osaka
Stations of Keihan Electric Railway